Mary Monroe is a New York Times bestselling African-American fiction author.  Her first novel, The Upper Room, was published by St. Martin's Press in 1985. She is best known for her novel God Don't Like Ugly (originally published by Dafina Books in Fall 2000), and the series revolving around the characters first introduced in this book.

Biography 
Mary Monroe was born on December 12, 1949, and is the third of four children, born in Toxey, Alabama. She spent the first part of her life in Alabama and Ohio, moving to Richmond, California, in 1973. She was the first person in her family to graduate from high school. She is a self-taught writer, she never attended college or took any writing classes.

Her first novel, The Upper Room, was published by St. Martin's Press in New York in 1985, and in London by Allison and Busby in 1986. Her second novel, God Don't Like Ugly, was published in 2000 by Kensington Books, and in 2001 won a PEN Oakland Award for Best Fiction of the Year.

A successful author and mother of two children, Monroe currently resides in Oakland, where she continues to write bestselling novels. Monroe is divorced, she travels the world and writes books based on life experiences and the people around her.

Awards 
 PEN Oakland/Josephine Miles Literary Award in 2001.
 Best Southern Author Award for Gonna Lay Down My Burdens in 2004.
 Maya Angelou Lifetime Achievement Award in 2016
 J. California Cooper Memorial Award in 2017
 The New York Times Best Seller list for the God Don't Like Ugly Series in September 2006

Bibliography

Novels 
 One House Over: The Neighbors #1
 The Devil You Know
 Never Trust A Stranger
 Can You Keep A Secret?
 Every Woman's Dream
 Bad Blood
 Family Of Lies
 Red Light Wives

Kensington Books 
 The Upper Room
 God Don't Like Ugly
 Gonna Lay Down My Burdens
 God Still Don't Like Ugly
 Red Light Wives
 In Sheep's Clothing
 God Don't Play
 Borrow Trouble
 Deliver Me From Evil
 Company We Keep
 She Had it Coming
 God Ain't Blind
 God Ain't Through Yet
 Mama Ruby
 God Don't Make Mistakes
 Lost Daughters

Reviews

God Don't Like Ugly
Some believe by using an innocent young girl's voice, Monroe provides a hopeful tone for a dark sequence of events. Monroe's writing of the characters in this novel is strong, and is the major reason for emotional investment in the book.

She Had It Coming
A common review is that the main picture Monroe draws through this novel is how secrets can destroy friendships. Monroe creates a chain of deceptions and betrayals, some of which are believable and others that may cause raised eyebrows.

Deliver Me From Evil
Some critics think the narration by Patricia Floyd provides a different outlook on the characters, who just from their actions are made to seem greedy, ignorant, or any other number of off-putting adjectives. Monroe leaves it unclear as to any details about the titular evil, providing much room for interpretation on the part of the audience. While others feel the narrative is fun but it has a repetitive exposition. The critics agree that the characters are nasty in nature and that readers are in for a surprise.

God Don't Make No Mistakes
A critical review is that Monroe uses humor to add new dimensions to the lives of ordinary people, making them seem interesting to readers.

References

External links 
Mary Monroe's official website
Facebook: Beverly Barton Official Fan Page
Twitter: Beverly Barton
"Author Interview with New York Times Best Selling Author Mary Monroe", Write 2 Be Magazine, November 11, 2020.
 Margaret Y. Buapim-West, "Lessons from a Self-Taught Writer – Bestselling Author Mary Monroe", WOW! Women On Writing.

20th-century African-American writers
21st-century African-American people
21st-century African-American women writers
21st-century American women writers
21st-century African-American writers
African-American writers
American women writers
Living people
PEN Oakland/Josephine Miles Literary Award winners
People from Choctaw County, Alabama
Writers from Alabama
1949 births